Japp may refer to:

Alexander Hay Japp (1837–1905), Scottish author, journalist and publisher
Francis Robert Japp, British chemist
Mikel Japp, Welsh musician
Chief Inspector Japp, a fictional police officer created by crime writer Agatha Christie
 Japp, a chocolate bar produced, marketed and sold by Marabou in Sweden and Freia in Norway

See also
JAP (disambiguation)
Jaap (disambiguation)